Lenoir–Rhyne University is a private Lutheran university in Hickory, North Carolina. Founded in 1891, the university is affiliated with the North Carolina Synod of the Evangelical Lutheran Church in America (ELCA).

Academics 
The university is accredited by the Commission on Colleges of the Southern Association of Colleges and Schools to award bachelor's and master's degrees. In the fall of 2018, LRU offered its first doctorate program, the Family Nurse Practitioner/Doctor of Nursing Practice (FNP/DNP). Overall, Lenoir–Rhyne University has over 50 undergraduate majors and nearly 30 graduate programs. The university has campuses in Hickory, Asheville, and Columbia, South Carolina.

Athletics 

Lenoir–Rhyne fields 20 intercollegiate teams and competes in National Collegiate Athletics Association Division II (NCAA Division II) as a member of the South Atlantic Conference. The school nickname is the Bears; its mascots are Joe and Josie Bear.

The school's swimming programs compete in the Bluegrass Mountain Swimming Conference and the men's lacrosse program was a member of the Deep South Lacrosse Conference until the conference dissolved in 2013. The men's and women's track & field and women's lacrosse teams compete as NCAA Division II Independents.

Prior to competing in the NCAA, the university was a member of the National Association of Intercollegiate Athletics (NAIA). The LRU football team won the NAIA National Championship in 1960 and made three trips to the title game in four years.  In 2013 the Lenoir Rhyne football team made it to the 2013 NCAA Division II Football Championship game. In 1980, the Bears' women's basketball team reached the NAIA Final Four while the men's basketball squad made it to the NAIA Elite Eight in 1992.

Recently, the Lenoir–Rhyne softball team has seen six straight trips to the NCAA Division II Playoffs, and reached the Southeast Region Finals in 2010 and 2011. Also, the Bears' women's soccer team advanced to the NCAA Division II Elite Eight in 2010 after the program's most successful season to date. The LRU men's and women's basketball teams have both reached Division II NCAA postseason play several times in the 2000s, with the Bear women hosting the Southeast Region Tournament in 2009.

Student life 
There are over 60 student clubs and organization on campus.

Undergraduate students are required to live on campus for their first three years.  The university designates Morgan Hall, Isenhour Hall, and half of Fritz-Conrad Hall exclusively for freshman students. Upperclassmen housing includes  Hickory House, Price Village, and Fourth Street apartments. In 2007 Lenoir-Rhyne built the Living Learning Center which provides upscale living and classroom space. Students who are part of the Lenoir-Rhyne Honors Academy or Greek Life may choose to live in designated on campus houses.

Fraternities and sororities

Notable alumni 
 Virginia Dare Aderholdt, an Arlington Hall cryptanalyst and Japanese translator, who decrypted the intercepted Japanese surrender message, August 14, 1945
 Frank Barger, high school football coach at Hickory High School; inducted into the North Carolina Sports Hall of Fame in 1993
 Rick Barnes, men's college basketball head coach
 Cherie Berry, former North Carolina Commissioner of Labor
 James B. Black, former Speaker of the North Carolina House of Representatives
 Lindsay Deal, MLB player
 Elizabeth K. Dillon, United States district judge of the United States District Court for the Western District of Virginia
 Kyle Dugger, NFL safety for the New England Patriots
 Perry Fewell, former NFL football coach; currently serves as the Senior Vice President of Officiating Administration for the NFL's officiating department
 Gary Glenn, political activist and former member of the Michigan House of Representatives
 David Hoyle, North Carolina politician who served as a member of the North Carolina General Assembly representing the state's forty-third Senate district
 W. Stine Isenhower, served in the North Carolina House of Representatives
 Burgess Jenkins, actor
 Harold Johnson, former sports commentator for WSOC-TV in Charlotte, North Carolina
 Craig Keith, former NFL tight end
 Donnie Kirkpatrick, college football coach
 John Milem, former NFL defensive end
 Don Padgett, MLB catcher/outfielder
 Elwood L. Perry, inventor of the form of fishing lure known as the spoonplug
 Buz Phillips, MLB pitcher
 Mike Pope, best known as NFL tight ends coach for the New York Giants, serving on all four of their Super Bowl Championship teams
 Tom Segura, stand-up comedian, actor and co-host of Your Mom's House podcast
 Dick Smith, MLB outfielder
 Herm Starrette, former MLB pitcher and coach
 Terence Steward, former NFL wide receiver
 Aaron Wheeler, former MLS forward for the Philadelphia Union

References

External links 
 
 Official athletics website

 
Educational institutions established in 1891
1891 establishments in North Carolina
Hickory, North Carolina
Universities and colleges accredited by the Southern Association of Colleges and Schools
Private universities and colleges in North Carolina